Giovanni Francesco Perini (active 15th to 16th centuries) was an Italian painter of the early Renaissance active mainly around Amelia, Umbria, Italy.

He was a pupil of Raphael at his workshop at the Vatican. He painted a Last Supper for the Amelia Cathedral. He also painted in Vitorchiano, Tuscanica and in Narni. He also completed stucco-work. He was a relative of the painters Giulio  and Bartolomeo Perini.

References

1. Angelo Di Tommaso: Gian Francesco Perini Pittore di Amelia e la sua Coena Domini, Amelia, Tip. F. Pastura - Petrignani, 1928, A5, pp. 50. In http://www.grupporicercafotografica.it/biblio.htm

2. Piero Adorno: Giovan Francesco Perini - Un pittore quasi sconosciuto del '500, fotografie di Franco Della Rosa, Antichità Viva, Anno XV, n. 2, Editrice Edam, Firenze, 1976. In: http://www.grupporicercafotografica.it/adorno.htm, pp. 18–28.

3. Franco Della Rosa et altri: Amelia e l'amerino - Storia Guida, Gruppo Ricerca Fotografica, Tip. Quatrini Archimede & Figli, Viterbo, 1984. In http://www.grupporicercafotografica.it/Storia.htm, pp. 53–57.

4. Franco Della Rosa: Usanze pittoriche celate nelle opere “Zuccari” e Perini tra le pieghe di due affreschi amerini, Gruppo Ricerca Fotografica, Ch-Cumün da Val Müstair - Grischun. In http://www.grupporicercafotografica.it/GRF2015-2.pdf, p. 12.

5. Franco Della Rosa: L’Opera del povero Giovan Francesco Perini è stata proprio un’Ultima Cena, Gruppo Ricerca Fotografica, Ch-Cumün da Val Müstair - Grischun. In http://www.grupporicercafotografica.it/GRF2016-5.pdf, p. 6.

Year of birth unknown
Year of death unknown
15th-century Italian painters
Italian male painters
16th-century Italian painters
Renaissance painters